WarVOX was a free, open-source VOIP-based war dialing tool for exploring, classifying, and auditing phone systems. WarVOX processed audio from each call by using signal processing techniques and without the need of modems. WarVOX used VoIP providers over the Internet instead of modems used by other war dialers. It compared the pauses between words to identify numbers using particular voicemail systems.

WarVox was merged into the Metasploit Project in August 2011.

The WarVOX project is no longer maintained.

See also

H. D. Moore
Metasploit
Rapid7
ToneLoc, a war dialer for DOS.
War dialing
w3af

References

External links
WarVOX official website
The Metasploit Project Metasploit Project website, which hosts the WarVOX code

Computer security software
Cyberwarfare
Network analyzers
Free security software
Phreaking
Telephony
Free network management software
Unix network-related software